George Wood may refer to:

Military
 George Adam Wood (1767–1831), British Army officer of the Napoleonic Era
 George Wood (British Army officer) (1898–1982), during World War II
 Pseudonym for Fritz Kolbe (1900–1971), German spy for the U.S. during World War II

Politics
 George Wood (died 1558), MP for Flintshire
 George Wood (judge) (1743–1824), English lawyer and politician
 George William Wood (1781–1843), English businessman and MP
 George Tyler Wood (1795–1858), governor of Texas
 George W. Wood (1808–1871), U.S. politician
 George Wood (Canadian politician) (1888–1966), member of Parliament, Brant, Ontario
 George Wood (New Zealand politician) (born 1946), former mayor of North Shore City, Auckland, New Zealand

Religion
 George Ingersoll Wood (1814–1899), American clergyman
 George O. Wood (1941-2022), former General Superintendent of the Assemblies of God
 George Warren Wood (1814-1901), Presbyterian minister and missionary

Sports
 George Wood (baseball) (1858–1924), left fielder in Major League Baseball, 1880–1892
 George Wood (Somerset cricketer) (1865–1948), first-class cricketer who played three matches in 1893 and 1894
 George Wood (Yorkshire cricketer) (1862–1948), first-class cricketer who played two matches for Yorkshire
 George Wood (cricketer, born 1893) (1893–1971), English cricketer
 George Wood (footballer) (born 1952), Scottish footballer
 George Wood (gymnast) (born 1999), British acrobatic gymnast

Other
 George Bacon Wood (1797–1879), American physician and writer
 George Arnold Wood (1865–1928), Australian historian
 George Herbert Wood (1867–1949), Canadian businessman who co-founded Wood Gundy and Company
 George Henry Wood (statistician) (1874–1945), English statistician
 Wee Georgie Wood (1894–1979), stage name of George Wood Bamlett, English actor
 George Wood (New Zealand statistician) (1900–1978), New Zealand economist, statistician and consumer advocate
 G. Wood (1919–2000), American actor
 George Wood (actor) (born 1981), English actor
 George Wood (Radio Sweden) (born 1949), American journalist
 George Henry Wood (railway director) (1836-?), director of the Isle of Man Railway
 George Wood, founder of Wawa Food Markets

See also
George Woods (disambiguation)